Roman Imperial Coinage, abbreviated RIC, is a British catalogue of Roman Imperial currency, from the time of the Battle of Actium (31 BC) to Late Antiquity in 491 AD. It is the result of many decades of work, from 1923 to 1994, and a successor to the previous 8-volume catalogue compiled by the numismatist Henry Cohen in the 19th century. 

It is the standard work for numismatic identification of coinage struck by authorisation of the Roman emperors.

Production 
The production of a chronological catalogue of Roman Imperial coinage was started in 1923 by Harold Mattingly, a numismatist at the British Museum, assisted by Edward Allen Sydenham. Their catalogue differed from its predecessor, produced by Henry Cohen in the 19th century. Cohen had classified the coins by emperor, and then alphabetically by the legend (text) on them. Mattingly broke down the classification further into which foundry, and in which series, each coin came from. Mattingly and Sydenham were joined by C. H. V. Sutherland in producing volumes IVb (1938) and IVc (1949), and by Percy H. Webb for volumes Va (1927) and Vb (1933). After 1930, the editorship of each of the final volumes was given to a specialist of the period. After Mattingly's death in 1964, Sutherland and R. A. G. Carson jointly took over editorship of the work.
 
In 1984, Sutherland published an expanded edition of the first volume of 1923, which was not as detailed as those that followed.

Contents 
The RIC comprises 13 volumes:
 volume 1 : Augustus–Vitellius (31 BC–69 AD), by H. Mattingly and E. A. Sydenham, London, 1923 (revised by C. H. V. Sutherland and R. A. G. Carson, 1984)
 volume 2 : Vespasian–Hadrian (69–138), by Harold Mattingly, Edward Allen Sydenham, London, 1926
 volume 3 : Antoninus Pius–Commodus (138–192), by H. Mattingly, E.A. Sydenham, London, 1930
 volume 4a : Pertinax–Geta VII and Caracalla (193–217), by H. Mattingly, E. A. Sydenham, London, 1936
 volume 4b : Macrinus–Pupienus (217–238), by H. Mattingly, E.A. Sydenham, C. H. V. Sutherland London, 1930
 volume 4c : Gordian III–Uranius Antoninus (238–253), by H. Mattingly, E. A. Sydenham, C.H.V. Sutherland, London, 1949
 volume 5a : Valerian–Florian (253–276), by Percy H. Webb, London, 1927
 volume 5b : Marcus Aurelius Probus–Maximian (276–310), by Percy H. Webb, London, 1933
 volume 6 : The Diocletian Reform–Maximinus II (294–313), by C. H. V. Sutherland, London, 1967
 volume 7 : Constantine I–Licinius (313–337), by P. M. Bruun, 1966
 volume 8 : The Family of Constantine I (337–364), by J. P. C. Kent, London, 1981
 volume 9 : Valentinian I–Theodosius I (364–395)
 volume 10 : The Divided Empire, 395–491, by J. P. C. Kent, London, 1994
 Western Roman Empire : Flavius Honorius–Romulus Augustus (395-476)
 Eastern Roman Empire : Flavius Arcadius–Zeno (395-491)

Each emperor is given a detailed history of the coinage of his reign, with a classification of the type of money, and within each type a registration, from its inscription.

For each coin listed, there is a description of both the obverse and reverse sides of the coin ("heads and tails"), and a notation depending on the rarity of known examples:

 C: common
 R1: rare, only twenty or so known
 R2: between five and fifteen known
 R3: four or five known
 R4: two or three known
 R5: only one known, unique

In the endpapers of each volume is a table of the coins that have reproductions.

See also 

 Roman currency
 Roman Inscriptions of Britain

Notes

References

Sources 
 

1923 non-fiction books
1926 non-fiction books
1927 non-fiction books
1930 non-fiction books
1933 non-fiction books
1936 non-fiction books
1949 non-fiction books
1966 non-fiction books
1967 non-fiction books
1981 non-fiction books
1994 non-fiction books
20th-century history books
Coins of ancient Rome
History books about ancient Rome
Numismatic catalogs